The Democratic Organization of African Workers' Trade Union was a regional organisation of the World Confederation of Labour. It has a membership of 35 unions and eight 'pan-African federations' in 29 countries.

In 2007, the federation merged with the ICFTU African Regional Organisation, forming the African Regional Organisation of the International Trade Union Confederation.

Pan-African federations

Fédération Panafricaine des Travailleurs de l’Industrie (FPTI)
Fédération Panafricaine des Syndicats des Services Publics (FPSSP)
Fédération Panafricaine des Travailleurs de l’Agriculture et de l’Alimentation (FEPATAA)
Fédération Panafricaine des Syndicats de l’Education (FEPASE)
Fédération Panafricaine des Employés (FPE)
Fédération Panafricaine des Travailleurs du Transport (FPTT)
Fédération Panafricaine des Travailleurs du Textile et de l'Habillement (FPTTH)
Fédération Panafricaine des travailleurs de la Construction et du Bois (FPTCB)

References

External links
www.odsta.org

World Confederation of Labour
Trade unions disestablished in 2007